Teona Todadze (born March 3, 1993) is a Georgian women's football midfielder. She played in the Turkish First League for İlkadım Belediyespor with jersey number 99. She is a member of the Georgian national team since 2009.

Playing career

Club
Teona Todadze played in the club FC Baia Zugdidi, which became Georgian champion in the 2009–10 season. After dissolving of the Georgian women's league in 2010, she moved to Turkey, and signed with Adana İdmanyurduspor to play in the 2012–13 Turkish Women's First Football League. After appearing two full seasons and a half season for the Adana-based team, she moved in February 2015 to İlkadım Belediyesi Yabancılar Pazarı Spor in Samsun. 
 
She debuted at the 2010–11 UEFA Women's Champions League – Group 5 playing for FC Baia Zugdidi against the Italian team AGSM Verona on August 7, 2010. She participated in three qualifying round matches.

International
Todadze was admitted to the Georgia women's under 19 national team, and played her first match against France at the 
2010 UEFA Women's U-19 Championship First qualifying round – Group 7 on September 19, 2009. She took part in the games against Serbian and Turkish junior women in the same tournament.

Appearing in the Georgia women's national team, she participated at all eight of the 2011 FIFA Women's World Cup qualification – UEFA Group 3 matches against Denmark, Scotland, Bulgaria,  and Greece.

She played in three games of the UEFA Women's Euro 2013 qualifying – Group 2 appearing against Malta, Armenia, and Faroe Islands.

Todadze participated at the 2015 FIFA Women's World Cup qualification – Group 2 matches against Lithuania, Montenegro, and Faroe Islands held in Lithuania in April 2013.

Career statistics
.

Honours

Club
 Georgia Championship
 FC Baia Zugdidi
 Winners (1): 2009–10

References

Living people
1993 births
Women's association football midfielders
Women's footballers from Georgia (country)
Expatriate women's footballers from Georgia (country)
Expatriate sportspeople from Georgia (country) in Turkey
Expatriate women's footballers in Turkey
FC Zugdidi players
Adana İdmanyurduspor players
İlkadım Belediyespor players
Georgia (country) women's international footballers